Carex balfourii is a tussock-forming perennial in the family Cyperaceae, that is native to northern parts of Réunion.

See also
 List of Carex species

References

balfourii
Plants described in 1909
Taxa named by Georg Kükenthal
Flora of Réunion